Lillian Eva Quan Dyck,  (born August 24, 1945) is a retired Canadian senator from Saskatchewan. A member of the Cree Gordon First Nation in Saskatchewan, and a first generation Chinese Canadian, she is the first female First Nations senator and first Canadian-born senator of Chinese descent.

Before being appointed to the Senate, Dyck was a neuroscientist with the University of Saskatchewan, where she was also an associate dean. On March 12, 1999, Dyck, who is one of the first Aboriginal women in Canada to pursue an academic career in the sciences, was presented with a lifetime achievement award by Indspire. She continues to teach at the university as well as conduct research on a part-time basis. In 2019 she received a Women of Distinction Awards Lifetime Achievement Award from the YWCA Saskatoon.

Alongside her research and academic work, the Honourable Dr. Lillian Eva Quan Dyck is well known for advocating for equity in the education and employment of women, Chinese Canadians and Aboriginals.

Early life and education 
Dyck was born in North Battleford, Saskatchewan, to a Chinese father, Yok Lee Quan, and Cree mother, Eva Muriel Mcnab. Her father came to Canada after paying the Head Tax, leaving his first family behind in China. Her mother was born on the Gordon Reserve, but lost her status when she married a non-Indian. She, like most First Nations women at the time, was sent to a residential school.

Dyck moved around frequently, living in many small towns in Saskatchewan and Alberta.  Her family hid their Indigenous heritage in order to protect themselves from racism. Taking her father's last name of Quan, her family was essentially the only Chinese family in town. As most First Nations people were living on reserves, she had no connection to them. Her family was the only non-white family in town.

Her father ran a Chinese cafe. She grew up waitressing and doing many other jobs, such as at the Regal Cafe in Killam, Alberta, where her mother's tombstone lies.

Dyck attended Swift Current Collegiate Institute, where she was actively encouraged to go to university.

Dyck earned her Bachelor of Arts (Honours), Master of Science Degrees in Biochemistry in 1968 and 1970 respectively, as well as her Ph.D. in Biological Psychiatry in 1981, all from the University of Saskatchewan. She was conferred a Doctor of Letters, Honoris Causa by Cape Breton University in 2007.

Career

Academic 
Before being appointed to the Senate, Dyck was a neuroscientist with the University of Saskatchewan, where she was also associate dean. On March 12, 1999, Dyck, who is of Cree and Chinese heritage and was one of the first Aboriginal women in Canada to pursue an academic career in the sciences, was presented with a lifetime achievement award by Indspire. Her research focuses on mechanisms of action of monoamine oxidase inhibitors to identify drugs useful for treatment of neurological disorders and stroke. She continues to teach at the university as well as conduct research on a part-time basis.

Senate 
Dyck was appointed to the Senate on the recommendation of Prime Minister Paul Martin on March 24, 2005.

Upon appointment, Dyck wished to sit as a New Democratic Party senator, but NDP spokesperson Karl Belanger immediately indicated that the party would not recognize her as a member of the NDP caucus: as the party platform specifically favours abolition of the Senate, it refused to confer legitimacy on the body by accepting Dyck; additionally, Dyck's membership in the NDP was revealed to have lapsed. Under the rules of the Senate, senators are free to designate themselves however they see fit, and Dyck changed her designation to say Independent New Democratic Party. On January 15, 2009, she joined the Liberal Senate caucus.

On January 29, 2014, Liberal Party leader Justin Trudeau announced all Liberal Senators, including Dyck, were removed from the Liberal caucus, and would continue sitting as Independents. The Senators referred to themselves as the Senate Liberal Caucus even though they are no longer members of the parliamentary Liberal caucus.

In 2014 Dyck accused Conservative MP Rob Clarke, who is also native, of "behaving like a white man" by pushing the Indian Act Amendment and Replacement Act. She later said she recognized the comment could be hurtful.

In April 2018 The Feminist Alliance for International Action recognized Lillian as a member of the Indigenous Famous Six. Other members are Jeannette Corbiere-Lavell, Yvonne Bedard, Sharon McIvor, Lynn Gehl, and Senator Sandra Lovelace Nicholas.

In November 2019, Dyck joined the rest of the Senate Liberal Caucus in deciding to dissolve the caucus and form the new Progressive Senate Group.

Political Work 
Dyck's priorities as a senator included Aboriginal women (Missing and Murdered Indigenous Women, Violence towards Aboriginal Women), Bill C-31 and its impact on Aboriginal women and men, women in science (recruitment and retention of women into professional scientific and technological careers), Aboriginal education and employment (recruitment and retention of aboriginals in the educational system and on the job), and mental health (the causes and treatment of psychiatric disorders).

She was outspoken on the issue of violence against women and successfully advocated for changes to legislation that will require judges to consider stiffer penalties for violent crimes against Indigenous women.

She also worked on Bill S-3, a bill that to restore official Indian status for thousands of women who lost their status for marrying non-indigenous men.

Speeches

Works Inspired By Her 
In 2017 a play based on Dyck's life "Cafe Daughter", written by Kenneth T. Williams, directed by Lisa C. Ravensbergen and featuring Tiffany Ayalik, was staged in Ottawa.

Bibliography

Selected Academic Publications

Non-academic publications 

 Dyck, Lillian E. "Dare to be brave: stand up for yourself." In : Women in the Canadian academic tundra: challenging the chill. (eds.) Elena Hannah, Linda Paul, Swani Vethamany-Globus. (Montreal : McGill-Queen's University Press; c2002) : 47-50.
 Dyck, Lillian E.."The University of Saskatchewan: a portrait." Women's Education. 9:2 (1991) :23.

References

External links
Lillian Dyck

From ‘Café Daughter’ to senator: The story of Lillian Eva Dyck takes the stage at the NAC

1945 births
Canadian neuroscientists
Canadian senators from Saskatchewan
Canadian university and college faculty deans
Women deans (academic)
Women members of the Senate of Canada
Cree people
First Nations women in politics
Independent Canadian senators
Living people
People from North Battleford
Academic staff of the University of Saskatchewan
Canadian women biologists
Liberal Party of Canada senators
Senate Liberal Caucus
Progressive Senate Group
Women in Saskatchewan politics
Canadian women neuroscientists
First Nations scientists
Indspire Awards
21st-century Canadian politicians
21st-century Canadian women politicians
Indigenous Canadian senators
Scientists from Saskatchewan
20th-century Canadian biologists
21st-century Canadian biologists
Canadian politicians of Chinese descent
Canadian indigenous women academics
First Nations academics
20th-century Canadian women scientists
George Gordon First Nation
21st-century Canadian women scientists
Officers of the Order of Canada
Politicians from Saskatoon